Ochthoeca is a genus of South American birds in the tyrant flycatcher family Tyrannidae.

Species
The genus contains nine species:

The genus Ochthoeca formerly included some species that are now placed in the genus Silvicultrix.

References

 
Tyrannidae
Bird genera
Taxonomy articles created by Polbot